San Marco is a minor basilica in Rome dedicated to Saint Mark the Evangelist located in the small Piazza di San Marco adjoining Piazza Venezia. It was first built in 336 by Pope Mark, whose remains are in an urn located below the main altar. The basilica is the national church of Venice in Rome.

History
In 336, Pope Mark built a church devoted to one of the Evangelists, his patron saint, Mark the Evangelist, in a place called ad Pallacinas. The church is thus recorded as Titulus Marci in the 499 synod of Pope Symmachus. At that time it became one of the stational churches of the city (Monday of the third week in Lent).

After a restoration in 792 by Pope Adrian I, the church was rebuilt by Pope Gregory IV in 833. Besides the addition of a Romanesque bell tower in 1154, the major change in the architecture of the church was ordered by Pope Paul II in 1465–70, when the façade of the church was restyled according to the Renaissance taste with a portico and loggia, using marbles taken from the Colosseum and the Theatre of Marcellus. The façade is attributed to Leon Battista Alberti. 
Paul II being a Venetian by birth, assigned the church to the Venetian people living in Rome.

The last major reworking of the basilica was started in 1654-57 and completed by Cardinal Angelo Maria Quirini in 1735–50. With these restorations, the church received its current Baroque decoration.

Interior
The floor of the church is below the ground level of the Renaissance period, and therefore steps lead down to the interior. The church retains its ancient basilica format, with a raised sanctuary. The inside of the church is clearly Baroque. However, the basilica shows noteworthy elements of all her earlier history:
 the apse mosaics, dating to Pope Gregory IV (827-844), show the Pope, with the squared halo of a living person, offering a model of the church to Christ, in the presence of Mark the Evangelist, Pope Mark and other saints;
 the wooden ceiling, with the emblem of Pope Paul II (1464-1471), is one of only two original 15th-century wooden ceilings in Rome, together with the one at Santa Maria Maggiore;
 Cardinal Angelo Maria Querini (cardinal priest of S. Marco 1728–1743) restored the Choir, renewed the pavement of the Chapel of the Sacrament, and rebuilt the high altar.
 the tomb of Leonardo Pesaro of Venice, aged 16, by Antonio Canova (1796).

In the portico are several early Christian grave stones, as well as the gravestone of Vannozza dei Cattanei, the mistress of Cardinal Rodrigo Borgia.

Cardinal priests

11th-12th centuries
 Johannes (attested 1059).
 Atto (attested 1072 - 1084). Excommunicated by Pope Gregory VII as schismatic.
 Robertus (attested 1086). 
 Romanus (attested 1098 - 1118). Supported the Antipope Clement III (Wido).
 Bonifatius (1111 - 1130?). Supported the Pope Anacletus II in the schism.
 Petrus (1130).
 Guido (1133 - 1143).
 Gilbertus (1143-1150).
 Rolandus Bandinelli (1151 - 1159). Elected Pope Alexander III.
 Johannes (1170 - 1190→).

13th-14th centuries

Goffredo da Castiglione  (September 1227 - 1239). Promoted Bishop of Sabina.
 Guillaume de Bray  (May 1262 - 29 April 1282).
 Pietro Peregrosso ( 1289 - 1 August 1295).
 Bertrand de Déaulx (18 December 1338 - 4 November 1348). Promoted Bishop of Sabina.
 Franciscus de Aptis (23 December 1356 - 25 August 1361).
 Jean de Blauzac (Blandiaco) (17 September 1361 - 1372). Promoted Bishop of Sabina.
 Petrus Amelii (18 December 1379 - 10 August 1389).
 Giovanni Fieschi (1390 - died before December 1384).
 Ludovico Donati, O. Min. (21 December 1381 - December 1386).
 Jean de Blauzac (17 Seotenber 1361 - September 1372). Promoted Bishop of Sabina.

15th century

 Angelo Correr (Corrario)  (12 June 1405 - 30 November 1406). Elected Pope.
 Antonio Calvi (2 July 1409 - 2 October 1411).
 Guillaume Fillastre (6 June 1411 - 6 November 1428).
 Pietro Barbo (16 June 1451 - 30 August 1464). Eected Pope.
 Marco Barbo  (2 October 1467 - 2 March 1491).
 Lorenzo Cibo de Mari (14 March 1491 - 21 December 1503).

16th century

 Domenico Grimani (25 December 1503 - 27 August 1523).
 Marco Cornaro (14 December 1523 - 20 May 1524). Appointed Bishop of Albano.
 Francesco Pisani (3 May 1527 - 21 June 1564). Appointed Bishop of Ostia.
 Luigi Cornaro (21 June 1564 - 2 June 1568). Opted for the titulus of S. Vitale.
 Luigi Pisani (2 June 1568 - 3 June 1570)
 Luigi Cornaro (9 June 1570 - 10 May 1584) [second term].
 Gianfrancesco Commendone (14 May 1584 - 26 December 1584).
 Agostino Valier (14 January 1585 - 1 June 1605). Appointed Bishop of Palestrina.

17th century

 Giovanni Delfino (1 June 1605 - 23 June 1621).
 Matteo Priuli (23 June 1621 - 13 March 1624).
 Pietro Valier (18 March 1624 - 9 April 1629).
 Federico Cornaro (26 April 1629 - 19 November 1646).
 Marcantonio Bragadin (19 November 1646 - 28 March 1658).
 Cristoforo Vidman (1 April 1658 - 30 September 1660).
 Pietro Ottoboni (15 November 1660 - 13 September 1677).
 Gregorio Barbarigo (13 September 1677 - 18 June 1697).
 Marcantonio Barbarigo  (1 July 1697 - 26 May 1706).

18th century

Giambattista Rubini (25 June 1706 - 17 February 1707).
 Giovanni Alberto Badoer (11 July 1712 - 17 May 1714).
 Luigi Priuli (28 May 1714 - 15 March 1720).
 Pietro Priuli (6 May 1720 - 22 January 1728).
 Angelo Maria Quirini, OSB (8 March 1728 - 6 January 1755).
 Carlo della Torre Rezzonico (17 February 1755 - 6 July 1758). Elected Pope Clement XIII.
 Antonio Maria Priuli (19 April 1762 - 26 October 1772).
 Carlo Rezzonico (14 December 1772 - 26 January 1799).

19th century
 Ludovico Flangini-Giovanelli (2 April 1800 - 24 May 1802) translated to S. Anastasia.
 Luigi Ercolani (22 July 1816 - 10 December 1825).
Karl Kajetan von Gaisruck (Gaysruck) (21 May 1829 - 19 November 1846).
Charles Januarius Acton (21 Dec 1846 Appointed - 23 Jun 1847 Died)
Giacomo Piccolomini (4 Oct 1847 Appointed - 17 Aug 1861 Died)
Pietro de Silvestri (27 Sep 1861 Appointed - 19 Nov 1875 Died)
Domenico Bartolini (3 Apr 1876 Appointed - 2 Oct 1887 Died)
Michelangelo Celesia, O.S.B. (25 Nov 1887 Appointed - 14 Apr 1904 Died)

20th century

József Samassa (11 Dec 1905 Appointed - 20 Aug 1912 Died)
Franz Xavier Nagl (2 Dec 1912 Appointed - 4 Feb 1913 Died)
Friedrich Piffl (25 May 1914 Appointed - 21 Apr 1932 Died)
Elia Dalla Costa (13 Mar 1933 Appointed - 22 Dec 1961 Died)
Giovanni Urbani (19 Mar 1962 Appointed - 17 Sep 1969 Died)
Albino Luciani (5 Mar 1973 Appointed - 26 Aug 1978). Elected Pope as Pope John Paul I

Cardinal protectors
Marco Cé (30 Jun 1979 Appointed - 12 May 2014 Died)
Angelo De Donatis (28 Jun 2018 Appointed - )

References

Bibliography
 Darko Senekovic, S. Marco, in D. Mondini, C. Jäggi, P. C. Claussen, Die Kirchen der Stadt Rom im Mittelalter 1050–1300, Band 4 (M-O), Stuttgart 2020, pp. 47–68.
 Roma, collection "L'Italia", Touring Editore, 2004, Milano.
 Macadam, Alta. Blue Guide Rome. A & C Black, London (1994), 
 Domenico Bartolini, La sotterranea confessione della romana basilica di S. Marco (Roma: Crispino Peccinelli 1844).
 Vincenzo Forcella, Le inscrizioni delle chiese e d' altri edifice di Roma Volume IV. (Roma: Fratelli Bencini 1874), pp. 341–376.
 Mariano Armellini, Le chiese di Roma, dalle loro origine sino al secolo XVI (Roma: Editrice Romana 1887), pp. 327–329.
 Barbara Zenker, Die Mitglieder des Kardinalkollegiums von 1130 bis 1159 (Würzburg 1964), pp. 82–88.
 Rudolf Hüls, Kardinäle, Klerus und Kirchen Roms, 1049-1130 (Tübingen: Max Niemeyer 1977), pp. 185–187.
 Werner Malaczek, Papst und Kardinalskolleg von 1191 bis 1216 (Vienna: Österreichische Kulturinstitut im Rom, 1984) [Abhandlungen, 6].

See also
 Churches of Rome

External links
 

Titular churches
Saint Mark
336 establishments
4th-century churches
Burial places of popes
Saint Mark
4th-century establishments in Italy